Santa Rosa County is a county located in the northwestern portion of the U.S. state of Florida. As of 2020, the population is 188,000. The county seat is Milton, which lies in the geographic center of the county. Other major communities within Santa Rosa County are Navarre, Pace, and Gulf Breeze. Navarre is the most populated community with a population of approximately 45,000 residents. Santa Rosa County is included in the Pensacola Metropolitan Statistical Area, which also includes Escambia County.

History
Santa Rosa County was created in 1842, when it was divided from Escambia County. It was named after the barrier island along its southern coast, which in turn had been named for the Roman Catholic saint, Rosa de Viterbo.

Santa Rosa County repealed its prohibition on alcohol in 2005.

Santa Rosa County has seen unprecedented growth in population, specifically in the communities of Navarre, Pace, and Gulf Breeze. The county is a quickly growing tourist destination because of its access to beaches and protected wilderness areas for kayaking, hiking, and camping.

Geography

National protected area
 Choctawhatchee National Forest (part)

Regions
Santa Rosa County can be divided into three distinct sections: South Santa Rosa, Central Santa Rosa, and North Santa Rosa. The sections are centered on the main east–west roads that pass through the county.

South Santa Rosa County comprises the area from Holley and Navarre in the east to Gulf Breeze at the western end of the Fairpoint Peninsula, and along U.S. Highway 98. A section of Santa Rosa Island, containing the unincorporated community of  Navarre Beach, is also part of South Santa Rosa County. Major bodies of water including Santa Rosa Sound, Pensacola Bay and East Bay strongly influence the housing and life style of citizens in the southern part of the county. This fast-growing region serves primarily as "bedroom communities" for Pensacola to the west and Hurlburt Field, Fort Walton Beach, and Eglin Air Force Base to the east. 

Central Santa Rosa County is the area north of the bays and south of the extensive forests separating it from North Santa Rosa. The central section developed along the so-called Old Spanish Trail that ran from St. Augustine to New Orleans, and further points west. Today, U.S. Highway 90 closely parallels the old trail, and is the main highway that connects the region. Despite recent growth, the Central Region is best identified by its rural roots, and can be best characterized by traditional Southern culture. The Pace and Milton communities compose the Central Region, with both having populations roughly around 30,000. The county seat, Milton is located where the trail crossed the Blackwater River. To the west of Milton bordering the Escambia River, Pace has experienced exponential growth both residential and commercial. Interstate 10 also passes through this section of the county. The U.S. Navy presence is marked by Whiting Field and NOLF Spencer Field.

Northern Santa Rosa County is forest and farming country. The only town in the north is Jay. Most development has been along State Road 4 which runs through the northern sections of Escambia, Santa Rosa, and Okaloosa counties. A large oil and natural gas field around Jay produced a great deal of oil, and made many farmers millionaires in the 1970s and 1980s, but the field has been depleted and is producing little oil today. The citizens have, for the most part, returned to farming and forestry for their livelihoods.

State Road 87 traverses the county from north to south, between U.S. Highway 98 and the border with Escambia County, Alabama near Brewton, where it connects with State Route 41. This road is a primary emergency evacuation route for the county during hurricanes.

Adjacent counties
 Escambia County, Alabama - north
 Okaloosa County, Florida - east
 Escambia County, Florida - west

Government

Board of County Commissioners
The Board of County Commissioners serves as the legislative and policy setting body of Santa Rosa County as established under Section 125 of the Florida Statutes. As such, the board enacts all legislation and authorizes programs and expenditures within the county. The board appoints a professionally trained county administrator who is responsible for policy and budget development and implementation.

The board comprises five members, elected countywide. Members must reside within the particular districts for which they seek election. Each year the board organizes itself, selecting a chair and vice-chair from among its members to preside at commission meetings.

The commission meets in regular session beginning at 9:00 a.m. the second and fourth Thursday of the month in the Commissioner's Board Room in the Administrative Center, 6495 Caroline Street, in Milton. Called meetings and workshops are scheduled periodically and are advertised and open to the public.

County officials

Demographics

As of the 2020 United States census, there were 188,000 people, 65,697 households, and 47,876 families residing in the county.

As of the census of 2000, there were 117,743 people, 43,793 households, and 33,326 families residing in the county. There were 49,119 housing units at an average density of 48 per square mile (19/km2). The racial makeup of the county was 90.72% White, 4.25% Black or African American, 1.01% Native American, 1.30% Asian, 0.08% Pacific Islander, 0.67% from other races, and 1.98% from two or more races.  2.52% of the population were Hispanic or Latino of any race.

There were 43,793 households, out of which 36.50% had children under the age of 18 living with them, 62.20% were married couples living together, 10.20% had a female householder with no husband present, and 23.90% were non-families. 19.30% of all households were made up of individuals, and 6.60% had someone living alone who was 65 years of age or older.  The average household size was 2.63 and the average family size was 3.00.

In the county, the population was spread out, with 26.60% under the age of 18, 7.20% from 18 to 24, 31.10% from 25 to 44, 24.10% from 45 to 64, and 11.00% who were 65 years of age or older.  The median age was 37 years. For every 100 females, there were 100.60 males.  For every 100 females age 18 and over, there were 97.90 males.

The median income for a household in the county was $41,881, and the median income for a family was $46,929. Males had a median income of $34,878 versus $22,304 for females. The per capita income for the county was $20,089.  About 7.90% of families and 9.80% of the population were below the poverty line, including 12.60% of those under age 18 and 7.50% of those age 65 or over.

Libraries
The Santa Rosa County Library System has five branches located in the following communities: Navarre, Gulf Breeze, Jay, Milton, and Pace.

Communities
The largest communities are Navarre and Pace.

Cities
 Gulf Breeze
 Milton

Town
 Jay

Census-designated places

 Allentown
 Avalon
 Bagdad
 Berrydale
 Brownsdale
 Chumuckla
 Cobbtown
 Dickerson City
 Dixonville
 East Milton
 Fidelis
 Floridatown
 Garcon Point
 Harold
 Holley
 Midway
 Mount Carmel
 Mulat
 Munson
 Navarre (Major Community)
 Navarre Beach
 New York
 Oriole Beach
 Pace (Major Community)
 Pea Ridge, Florida
 Pine Level
 Springhill
 Tiger Point
 Wallace
 Whitfield
 Woodlawn Beach

Politics

Transportation

Airports
 Fort Walton Beach Airport
 Peter Prince Field

Highways

Santa Rosa County contains many highways, which include Navarre Parkway and Gulf Breeze Parkway (US 98), Interstate 10, Avalon Boulevard, and Highways 4, 87, 89, and 90.

See also
 National Register of Historic Places listings in Santa Rosa County, Florida

Notes

References

External links

Newspapers
Print:
 South Santa Rosa News
 Gulf Breeze News
 Northwest Florida Daily News (Fort Walton Beach)
 Pensacola News Journal
 Milton Press Gazette aka the Santa Rosa Press Gazette; available in full-text with images in the Florida Digital Newspaper Library
 Navarre Press

Digital only:
 Navarre Newspaper
 EscaRosa Press
 Milton Chronicle - online newsletter, defunct since 2015

Government links/constitutional offices
 Santa Rosa County Website
 Santa Rosa County Board of County Commissioners
 Santa Rosa County Supervisor of Elections
 Santa Rosa County Property Appraiser
 Santa Rosa County Sheriff's Office
 Santa Rosa County Tax Collector
 Santa Rosa Economic Development Office
 Santa Rosa County GIS Mapping System

Special districts
 Santa Rosa County School District
 Northwest Florida Water Management District

Judicial branch
 Santa Rosa County Clerk of Courts
  Public Defender, 1st Judicial Circuit of Florida serving Escambia, Santa Rosa, Okaloosa, and Walton counties
  Office of the State Attorney, 1st Judicial Circuit of Florida
  Circuit and County Court for the 1st Judicial Circuit of Florida

Tourism links
 Santa Rosa County Chamber of Commerce

Community and civic organizations
 Junior League of Pensacola
 United Way of Santa Rosa County

Hospitals
 Santa Rosa Medical Center Hospital and Emergency Room located in Milton, Florida

 
Florida counties
1842 establishments in Florida Territory
Populated places established in 1842
Pensacola metropolitan area
North Florida